The Church of Nuestra Señora de la Asunción (Spanish: Iglesia de Nuestra Señora de la Asunción) is a church located in Valdemoro, Spain. It was declared Bien de Interés Cultural in 1981.

Built in Baroque style, it has a nave measuring 60 x 28 meters, with side chapels.  The high altar is decorated by the paintings St. Peter of Verona by  Ramón Bayeu, The Assumption of the Virgin by Francisco Bayeu, and the Apparition of the Virgin to St. Julian  by Francisco Goya. The bell tower was completed in 1764.

References 

Nuestra Senora De La Asuncion, Valdemoro
Baroque architecture in the Community of Madrid
18th-century Roman Catholic church buildings in Spain
Roman Catholic churches completed in 1764
Bien de Interés Cultural landmarks in the Community of Madrid
1764 establishments in Spain